The Former Sioux County Courthouse in Fort Yates, North Dakota, United States, was built in 1922 by contractor Adam Ulrich Ostrum for Sioux County.  It was listed on the National Register of Historic Places (NRHP) in 1985 but was delisted in 2009.

The NRHP nomination form described the building as "rather plain", of a type of "'pattern book' courthouses prevalent in North Dakota counties south and west of the Missouri River."  The nomination suggested there was a lower awareness of the historic value of buildings in the area and noted that the listing "could encourage further preservation in the area."

Delisting of a National Register-listed property usually follows demolition or other loss of its historic integrity.

References

County courthouses in North Dakota
Courthouses on the National Register of Historic Places in North Dakota
Government buildings completed in 1922
Former National Register of Historic Places in North Dakota
1922 establishments in North Dakota